There were two Kazakh exoduses from Xinjiang, the first one occurred in the 1930s and 1940s as Kazakhs fled from the Soviet Union into Xinjiang, Gansu, Qinghai, Tibet and British India and the second one occurred in waves during the 1950s and 1960s after the victory of the Chinese Communist Party in Xinjiang.

First exodus
A Kazakh chief was skinned with his skin to be used as a religious implement & his heart cut out of his chest by the Oirat Mongol Ja Lama. Another Kazakh was also skinned. A White Guard soldier's heart was eaten by the Mongol Choijon Lama. Mongol banner bloods were sprinkeled with Russian White Guard and Chinese blood from hearts according to A. V. Burdukov. The Kazakh chief who was skinned alive was named Khaisan. His skin along with another man's skin were found by Cossacks in his ger in Muunjaviin Ulaan on 8 February 1914 under Captain Bulatov. Owen Lattimore used the words "a strange, romantic and sometimes savage figure" for the Mongol Sandagdorjiyn Magsarjav (1877-1927). Magsarjav  had served under Ungern-Sternberg. In Uriankhai Kazakh bandits who were captured had their hearts cut out and sacrificed by Magsarjav.

In 1936, after Sheng Shicai expelled 30,000 Kazakhs from Xinjiang to Qinghai, Hui Chinese led by General Ma Bufang massacred their fellow Muslim Kazakhs, until there were 135 of them left.

Hui Tungan, Tibetan and Oirat Mongol claims against Kazakhs 
The Kazakhs were plundering and robbing on the Tibetan-Kokonor plateau in Qinghai as they came through Gansu and northern Xinjiang. There were over 7,000 of them between 1938 and 1941. On the Kokonor plateau, Hui (Tungans), Tibetans and Kazakhs continued to battle each other despite the Kazakh nomads being settled in demarcated pasturelands under Ma Bufang's watch in 1941. Japanese spy Hisao Kimura was told by a Tibetan Lama in Qinghai that Kazakhs were enemies of Tibetans, saying "This land, is very unsettled compared with Inner Mongolia. To the west the Kazakhs persecute our people, and we are powerless to stop them. Therefore I advise you to leave for your native land as soon as you have finished whatever you came to do: otherwise leave for Tibet. In that holy land there is peace." The Kazakhs who migrated to Iran and Pakistan via India and Tibet later in the 1950s moved to Turkey and some of these Kazakhs in Turkey ended up in the 1960s as guest workers in Germany.

Oirat Mongol Buddhists in Qinghai were slaughtered and looted by Kazakhs (Moslem Khyber Khasaks) who invaded Tibet via the Nan Shan mountains in Xinjiang. The Salar and Hui Muslims of Qinghai told Office of Strategic Services agent Leonard Francis Clark that the Kazakhs slaughtered 8,000 Mongols.

One local Hui Muslims of Qinghai threatened American OSS agent Leonard Francis Clark that if the Muslims and Communists united, they would be unstoppable, and that if China fell to the communists, the Americans would unable to defeat even China's rabble and would suffer huge death tolls in battle.

The advance of the Communists under Li Bao (Lin Pao) forced the Hui general Ma Dei-bio to leave Qinghai to confront him, therefore some Kazakh bands were still going around stealing and murdering people. The Mongols were slaughtered by the Kazakhs since the Nationalist government of China disarmed the Mongols.

The Tibetan Rong-pa taught agriculture to former nomad Mongols who began using camels to plough their land in Tsaidam. Hui Muslim governor Ma Bufang appointed Hui Muslim colonel Ma Dei-bio as southern Qinghai's Amban. Me Dei-bio slaughtered Ngoloks by throwing them into the yellow river after wrapping them in leather. 480 Ngolok families were killed in this manner. He built a fort with Chinese stone lions around it guarded by Hui Muslims to control the Tibetans. Hui Muslim Ma Sheng-lung wore a white Moslem skull-cap, had a white stallion and had a Tibetan cap made of red fox and had a poniard and sword.

The Communists triumphed and took all of Xinjiang, northwest China, northern China, Manchuria and Inner Mongolia, and 300,000 anti-communist forces were lost. Hui Muslim governor Ma Bufang ordered the expedition under Clark to flee back to Xinjiang after the communist victory via radiogram. A group of dancers and musicians from Khotan were entertaining the Clark expedition when the news broke. Kazakhs stole Mongol horses from the expedition and the Hui Muslim leader was told by a Tibetan scout that the Kazakhs did it. The Kazakhs were fleeing to the India-Afghan border and the Mongols wanted to attack them and take the horses back before they made it but they had no resources to do it.

As China was falling to the Communists, OSS agent Leonard Francis Clark drafted a plan while he was in Qinghai for fighting communism all over Asia, planning for him to attack the Soviet Union. He planned to go to his headquarters in Lanzhou (Lanchow) to give Ma Bufang the plans as it was a matter of time when all northwestern areas under Ma Bufang would come under communist control. He believed only a path to central and south Asia on land could keep Ma Bufang's forces in one pieces. They were planning to save 30,000 Muslim soldiers for war against communism and smuggle in arms through Tibet. Clark said that Ma Bufang should visit Turkey and Cairo and make hajj to Mecca for calling for support against international communism. Well armed Kazakhs over a period of eight years before Clark's expedition had slaughtered and devastated the Oirat Mongols in the Tsaidam Basin of Xinjiang, the 1,000 Kazakh families (Hussack) came to the Tsaidam via the Nan shan in Xinjiang and then came back to where they came from after 8 years of war against the Mongols. Clark noted they dwelled in gers and they spoke Turki and were "fanatic Mohammedans, professional killers". Mongol Hoshun (banner) were divided into Sumon (arrow) and one arrow lost 1,000 horses in a single night to the Kazakhs. Northern Qinghai (Amdo) still had 26 fragmented Mongol banners after the Kazakh slaughters of Mongols. These banner divisions were created by the Qing dynasty who scattered the Mongols on the western borders.

Some Tibetans in Qinghai claimed descent from the Tanguts of Khara Khoto in Western Xia and claimed that their ancestors fled to Qinghai after a Chinese army expelled them from Khara Khoto. The Oirat Mongol Prince Dorje told Leonard Francis Clark and the Tibetans and the Hui and Salar Muslims Abdul and Solomon Ma on how the Manchus committed the Dzungar genocide against his Oirat people and how they conquered Xinjiang from the Oirat Mongol Torgut West banner and destroying the south wing of the Mongols. They took control of the four Khanates of the Khalkha in Outer Mongolia and the 5th Khanate (the Oirat Torgut horde). He also spoke about those Torgut Oirats who had earlier migrated to Kalmykia in Russia and then fought against the Ottoman Turkish Muslim empire, and then crushed the Swedish king Charles XII, and then how 400,0000 Torguts migrated back to Dzungaria in 1771, fighting against the Cossack armies of Tsarina of Russia Catherine the great. They lost 300,000 children, women and men to the Cossacks as they went back to Xinjiang. He mentioned how this had made Russia "lose" the support of Mongols. 50,000 Oirats survived after 300,000 Oirat Mongols were slaughtered by Russian Cossacks on Catherine's orders. Prince Dorje then proclaimed that the Oirat Torghut banners were ready for revenge against the "Slavic masses", by fighting against the Soviet Russian red army and asked Clark for America to help the west Mongols against the Slavic Russians. Clark said that the Pentagon and White House would decide and that he could do nothing about it since he was busy with inciting Muslims in Qinghai to jihad against communists and on the Amne Machin mountain to find radioactive material.

The Buddhist Oirat Mongols of Qinghai including Prince Dorje and Torja (in his own Ger) gathered with Leonard Frances Clark. Clark noted the Lamaist Buddhist shrine which they prayed to. The Hui Muslims and Salar Muslims did not even want to stoop to entering the Mongol ger. The Mongol women and their husbands whispered in fear on how afraid they were of the Hui Muslims and how three times in a century the Muslims would go on jihad against them in Qinghai and Torja feared the next one was soon. Torja had only one musket.

The Mongol Khans and Chinese emperors had long received dancing girls from Kucha in Xinjiang as tribute. Kucha (Uyghur) dancing girls danced in the Qinghai yamen governor palace of Ma Bufang in Xining (Sining, Hsi-ning) for Leonard Clark. Clark said she was dancing like the Seven Veils of Maya and pictured her as Alexander queen's Roxelana as she was dressed in blue and gold. Oirat Prince Dorje started at the girls, including a Persian looking one and polished his spectacles (pince-nez) to stare at them and look away from his books.

Black yaks and Bactrian camels with 2 humps in caravans with Afghans, Afridis, Salars, Kazakhs, Quergares, Oiuzhurs, Turki, Taranchi, Hui (Tungans), Han Chinese, Mongols and Tibetans numbering 60,000 were moving around Xining (Sining) as Clark noticed.

From the Khyber pass some Sharaunis and Afridis came to Qinghai to join the Tungan Hui and Salar cavalry of Ma Bufang. One of the Tungn and Salars had 19 shotgun, sword and gunshot injuries and his name was Habibu. They came from Hezhou (Hochou) and Shengwha and numbered 50 wearing black Cossack polished boots or Tibetan boots, red robes and fur caps. One of the Muslims was Tan Chen-te, forty with a sword which he used to behead people in fighting and Abdul. There were 20 Tibetan Buddhists who sought death in battle to achieve Nirvana and were all over 6 feet tall. They had Tibetan broadswords, chained Tibetan short daggers, fifty shot magazines with Belgian and German automatic battle pistols and European rifles. Clark was afraid of these men and that he could have no authority over them as they went further and further way from Governor Ma Bufang (Ma Pu-Fang).

One of the Hui and Salar Muslims assigned to guard Clark was named Hassan. Clark had bought an American cavalry saddle from a missionary in Xinjing for 30 dollars and a Mongol saddle. He put a sheepskin robe on it to make a pillow. Ma Bufang's son was Marshal Ma Jiyuan (Ma-yuan) who fought against the communists as the northwestern supreme field commander. One of Ma Jiyuan's personal bodyguards was a Salar, 26 years old, named Ma Wei-shan (Abdul) and he was called the "deadliest gunman in China". He was assigned to the Clark expedition and Clark favourable compared Abdul and the other Salar and Hui Muslims to Pashtun Khyber pass Waziri and Afridi tribesmen and believed them to be fierce warriors. Abdul fought in Persia and Afghanistan. He was a Qinghai Peace Preservation Corps sergeant serving under Ma Bufang and a guerilla strategist. Clark complimented him again by saying in a European army he would have been made a captaincy, and personally led 300 cavalry men into battle and could easily create and make his own battle plan which would make majors envious across the world. He refused to use a tent like other non-commissioned officers. He would just use buttermilk cured sheepskin robes unless it was raining or snowing. Colonel Ma said that Abdul killed communists, bandits, Tungans, Tibetans, Turks, Mongols, Japanese and Russians in battle. Abdul claimed that Tibetans were far superior to Japanese. These Salar and Hui Muslims if the geography allowed mostly charged enemy flanks on horseback if they were not pinned down by gunfire. These Salar and Hui Muslims were both well trained with guns and horse and mostly did not take prisoners in Tibet unless they needed questions. They usually cut the fallen throats after winning a battle. Clark favourable compared these Hui and Salar Muslims and Tibetans with Gurkha warriors in the British Indian army and Pashtun Muslims of the Northwest Frontier Province of British India. Abdul used his right hand as his gun hand which he didn't wear a glove on, he could sing, he didn't drink alcohol, he was extremely intimidating but mannered, disciplined and quiet, on his forehead he had a bayonet scar, he was handsome, blue eyed, white skinned, over 6 feet tall. He had buckhorn resting forks (bifurcated) on his chased silver inlaid .30 caliber Skoda rifle, a dagger hafted with gold and bone, a sub-machine automatic pistol of German designed but manufactured in China, and wool, fur, cloth and sheepskin robes. He was paid in his equipment, food and a monthly pay in Chinese silver yuan equivalent to $30. Abdul knew Chinese, Tibetan and Salar languages and could sing in them. Abdul became a commissioned officer under Colonel Ma. Abdul led the songs for the march. Abdul smoked a Chinese water pipe out of aluminum and he told of his military's tactics against Tibetan brigands to Clark (Clark-ah). He fought off 5 Tibetan attacks. Abdul led 1,000 riflemen and horses to protect caravans. Colonel Ma and Abdul fought off many Tibetan attacks and cavalry charges and said that in northwest China the best guerilla fighter was the colonel. He was assigned to guard against Tibet and protect the south flank of ma Bufang for this reason, but said that even Ngoloks were too much for colonel Ma. The Muslims with the Clark expedition moderately smoked and some drank alcohol but many orthodox Muslims in the region did not drink alcohol or smoke tobacco. Prince Dorje then started discussing security and scouts for the expedition. Captain Tan and Colonel Ma tried to conscript Tibetans to work for them at Fort Ta Ho Pa but were unsuccessful.

Colonel Ma and the expedition with Clark were armed with miscellaneous weapons and had 3 Japanese Nambu machine guns and 50 rifles. They sent a 2 Tanguts to find water. They had Chinese potato-masher hand grenades, American Tommy sub machine guns manufactured in China, Skoda rifles and a small Japanese mortar. They kept their safeties on with bullets in chambers and guns loaded and protected their flanks and rear by riding in fan formation against Tibetan brigand attacks. The Hui Tungans used the word yeh ma and Tibetans used the word kyang for kulan, the feces of wild asses. Eagles were called yeh ying and rabbits were called yeh tu. Tse shar meant "peak shining time". Tibetan drivers whipped yaks and used wooden saddles for their yaks while they dressed in sheepskins.

Kazakh claims against Tibetans, Oirat Mongols and Hui Tungans 
Over the space of 2 years of battles, 5,000 Kazakhs were killed by Hui Muslim Chinese and Tibetans in Gansu. There were 13,000 Kazakhs who survived out of 18,000 before the battles. They fled to India in September 1940. Tibetan cavalry numbering 1,000 attacked and fought the Kazakhs for 3 days to block their path but lost and the Kazakhs made it to the British Indian border. Many Kazakhs died when the British ordered Indian guards to shoot. When they found out they were civilians the 3,039 surviving Kazakhs were then let into India via Chuchul checkpoint in September 1941. In 3 years, 15,000 Kazakhs were killed. Eliskhan Batur Elifuglu (1919-1943) was their leader. The Kazakhs were expelled to the outskirts of Muzaffar Abad city in an open camp near the mountains by the Hindu Kashmir Majaraja Herisin who didn't want them there. 10-15 Kazakhs died daily from illness due to heavy Monsson rains over their tents. Their livestock died and Indian soldiers blocked them from leaving the camp. When Muslim leader Muhammad Ali Jinnah heard about their plight he helped them, arranging them to go to Gari Habibullah in April 1942 and then Indian Muslims hosted them in Ternova village. Illness and poor died as well as India's warm climate killed many Kazakhs. Kazakhs got residence permits to leave camp after Eliskhan appealed to Governor general Viceroy Sir Lord Halifax when he visited them in 1941. The news about the Kazakh situation appeared in newspapers so they received help from the Muslim Nawabs Hamidullah Khan of Bhohal and Osman Ali Khan of Hyderabad. 450 Kazakhs moved to the colder Bhohal province. Chatyral, Suvat and Abutabad received 700 Kazakhs. Then Delhi, Calcutta and Lahore received the Bhopal Kazakhs in 1944. Pakistan then received the majority of the Kazakhs after partition on 14 August 1947.

The Kazakhs accused Tibetans and Tungans (Hui Muslims) of attacking them in Gansu, Qinghai and Tibet when they reached British India and were debriefed by British officials.

The Kazakhs said they were fleeing from the Soviets and from the Soviet backed warlord Sheng Shicai in Xinjiang and said when they entered Qinghai and Gansu they originally numbered 18,000. These Kazakhs accused Tibetan raiders of killing their Kenzhebay, a relative of their leader Elisqan, and accused the Hui Muslim ruled Qinghai government of ignoring their complaint about the Tibetans murdering him so they decided to move in 1940 out of Qinghai towards India and Tibet and stopped at Altïnšöke on the way for pasture. The Kazakhs accused Tibet people called Qulïq of being warlike and attacking the Kazakhs and claimed that Elisqan and his Kazakhs defeated them. One of them shot a Kazakh named Omar. The Kazakhs then accused a Hui Muslim (Dungan) called Fulušan of leading an assault with Mongol and Tibetan troops against the Kazakhs in Altïnšöke (Алтыншёке).

From Northern Xinjiang over 7,000 Kazakhs fled to the Tibetan Plateau via Gansu and were wreaking massive havoc so Ma Bufang solved the problem by relegating the Kazakhs into designated pastureland in Qinghai, but Hui, Tibetans, and Kazakhs in the region continued to clash against each other.

Tibetans attacked and fought against the Kazakhs as they entered Tibet via Gansu and Qinghai.

In northern Tibet, Kazakhs clashed with Tibetan soldiers and then the Kazakhs were sent to Ladakh.

Tibetan troops robbed and killed Kazakhs 400 miles east of Lhasa at Chamdo when the Kazakhs were entering Tibet.

In 1934, 1935, 1936–1938 from Qumil Eliqsan led the Kerey Kazakhs to migrate to Gansu and the amount was estimated at 18,000, and they entered Gansu and Qinghai.

Tibetan troops serving under the Dalai Lama murdered the American CIA agent Douglas Mackiernan and his two White Russian helpers because he was dressed as a Kazakh, their enemy.

Soviet persecution of Kazakhs led to Kazakhs from Soviet Kazakhstan moving to Xinjiang.

The Kazakhs had settled in the Dzungaria area of Xinjiang after the Dzungar genocide by the Manchus wiped out most of the native Dzungar Oirats and fleeing from Soviet engineered famines against the Kazakhs like the Kazakh famine of 1919–1922 and Kazakhstan famine of 1932–1933. The Kazakhs had defected to the Republic of China and fought against the Soviet Communist backed Uyghurs in the Ili Rebellion.

Second exodus
The initial exodus began in 1950 or the Year of the Tiger, when the victorious Chinese Communist Army took control, not guaranteeing nor overtly denying the Kazakh way of life: tribalism and Islam. Families voted at Barkol and set out to preserve their way of life in the steppes of Kashmir.

This initial journey to Kashmir was opposed by the victorious Chinese Red Army as they passed through Chinese territory. The first attack happened at Barkol in Kumul Prefecture and the second near Timurlik. The Kazakh groups that survived fled into Tibet to survive. The victory by the Chinese Red Army was not the only thing that hindered the initial Kazakh exodus; they also suffered illness which killed countless individuals. It took three months for the Kazakhs to cross Tibet and arrive at Srinagar, Kashmir.

In 1962, the Kazakhs embarked on another exodus from Xinjiang. This time the Kazakh and members of other ethnic groups fled to the Soviet Union due to the famine, mass riots and communist reforms that again were imposed on the Kazakhs' traditional way of life.

See also
 Ospan Batyr
 Oralman, ethnic Kazakh migrants to Kazakhstan since 1991
 Kazakhs in China
 2020 Dungan–Kazakh ethnic clashes

References

Sources
 Kazak Exodus, by Godfrey Lias, London: Evan Brothers Limited (1956)
 
 
Clark, Milton J. "How the Kazakhs Fled to Freedom." National Geographic Magazine. Nov. 1954, pp. 621–644.
Harris, Lillian C. "Xinjiang, Central Asia and the Implications for China's Policy in the Islamic World." The China Quarterly, no. 133 (March 1993), pp. 111–29.
Moseley, George. Nichols, J. L. (Review Author). "A Sino-Soviet Cultural Frontier: The Ili Kazakh Autonomous Chou." The Journal of Asian Studies, vol. 27, no. 3 (May 1968), pp. 628–29.

.
20th century in Xinjiang
Islam in China
1950s in China
1960s in China
China–Soviet Union relations
Refugees in the Soviet Union
Persecution of Kazakhs